La otra familia is a Mexican 2011 family drama film starring Jorge Salinas, along with Luis Roberto Guzmán, Bruno Loza, Carmen Salinas and Ana Serradilla. It was directed and written by Gustavo Loza. The film was produced by the Black River Productions company and Barracuda Films. The filming began in 2010 in Saltillo, Coahuila and was released on March 25, 2011.

Plot
Hendrix is the seven-year-old son of Nina, a woman addicted to drugs. After leaving Hendrix home alone for three days, Nina's friend Ivana takes him away, but cannot house him. Instead, she gives him to her friends, Jean Paul and Chema, a well-to-do, stable, gay couple. At first, Chema bristles at the intrusion, and the couple's maid and gardener worry if homosexual men will make good role models to a young boy. However, soon they become a warm and loving family. Meanwhile, Patrick, Nina's drug addicted lover and dealer, decides a good way to pay off a debt to his dealer would be to sell the child. He helps Nina to track down her son, and she insists on taking him away, even though Hendrix wants his mother to stay with his new family. While Nina is in a drug-induced stupor, Patrick takes the child and sells him to a couple having marital problems after the loss of their infant son. Not long after the couple is left with Hendrix, the boy insists on calling his "dads", who come to get him. The husband, worried about gay men taking Hendrix, calls the police. The police arrest Jean Paul and Chema for kidnapping and sexual assault, though there is no evidence of abuse to hold them for long. Nina, distraught over losing her son again, overdoses and dies. Patrick, trying to meet with the husband again to get money, is arrested. In the end, Hendrix is returned to Jean Paul and Chema, and allowed to resume a healthy life as their son.

References

External links
 

2011 films
Mexican LGBT-related films
2011 LGBT-related films
LGBT-related drama films
2011 drama films
2010s Mexican films